Swansboro Historic District is a national historic district located at Swansboro, Onslow County, North Carolina.  The district encompasses 74 contributing buildings and 1 contributing site in the central business district and surrounding residential sections of Swansboro.  The district largely developed between 1890 and 1925 and includes notable examples of Federal, Greek Revival, and Bungalow / American Craftsman style architecture. Notable contributing buildings include the Jonathan Green House, Beaufort House, Bazel Hawkins House, George E. Bell House, James Elijah Parkin House (1893), William Pugh Ferrand Store (1839), the Robert Spence McLean Store, Watson and Parkin "double store" (1910), Jim Kennedy Fish House (1930s), Baptist Church (1897), and the Emmerton School (1920s).

It was listed on the National Register of Historic Places in 1990.

References

External links

Historic American Buildings Survey in North Carolina
Historic districts on the National Register of Historic Places in North Carolina
Federal architecture in North Carolina
Greek Revival architecture in North Carolina
Buildings and structures in Onslow County, North Carolina
National Register of Historic Places in Onslow County, North Carolina